Mädchen, Mädchen (English: Girls, Girls), also known as Girls on Top, is a 2001 German film directed by Dennis Gansel. Its story is about an eighteen-year-old girl named Inken (Diana Amft), who is frustrated at not having had an orgasm yet with her boyfriend. Her two best friends are Vicky (Felicitas Woll), who is in the same situation as Inken, and the still virgin Lena (Karoline Herfurth). The movie is about the girls' search to find someone to give them an orgasm. The film was followed by a 2004 sequel, Mädchen, Mädchen 2 – Loft oder Liebe. The film had over 1,700,000 admissions in Germany and grossed $233,538 in Russia.

Cast
Diana Amft as Inken 
Karoline Herfurth as Lena
Felicitas Woll as Victoria
Andreas Christ as Nick
Max Riemelt as Flin
Florian Lukas as Trainer Carsten
Frederic Welter as Tim 
Arzu Bazman as Cheyenne
Ulrike Kriener as Ingrid
Martin Reinhold as Dirk
Henning Baum as Trainer Chris
Elyas M'Barek as Dude
Alexandra Schiffer as Julia
Germain Wagner as Gero
Dennis Gansel as The Postman
Josephine Jacob as Tina
Elisabeth Scherer as Lena's Grandmother
Barbara Bauer as Hippie Girl
Florian Weikert Guy at Disco

References

External links
 
 

2001 films
2001 comedy films
2000s German-language films
2000s teen sex comedy films
Films directed by Dennis Gansel
German sex comedy films
German teen comedy films
2000s German films